Rousseau is a provincial electoral district in the Lanaudière and Laurentides regions of Quebec, Canada, that elects members to the National Assembly of Quebec. It notably includes the municipalities of Saint-Lin–Laurentides and Sainte-Julienne.

It was created for the 1981 election from parts of the Prévost, Joliette-Montcalm and L'Assomption electoral districts.

In the change from the 2001 to the 2011 electoral map, it gained Chertsey and Saint-Hippolyte from Bertrand, but lost L'Épiphanie (town), L'Épiphanie (parish), and the part of the city of L'Assomption that it formerly had to the L'Assomption electoral district.

In the change from the 2011 to the 2017 electoral map, it will gain Saint-Jacques, Saint-Liguori and Sainte-Marie-Salomé from Joliette and will lose Chertsey and Rawdon to Bertrand and Sainte-Sophie and Saint-Hippolyte to the new riding of Prévost.

It was named after botany professor Jacques Rousseau.

Members of the National Assembly

Election results

^ Change is from redistributed results. CAQ change is from ADQ.

|-
 
|Liberal
|Michel F. Brunet
|align="right"|9,127
|align="right"|31.02
|align="right"|+1.83

|-

|-
|}

|-
 
|Liberal
|John A. Redmond
|align="right"|9,533
|align="right"|29.19
|align="right"|-2.84

|-

|Socialist Democracy
|Francis Martin
|align="right"|243
|align="right"|0.74
|align="right"|-1.32
|-
|}

|-
 
|Liberal
|Robert Thérien
|align="right"|17,292
|align="right"|60.25
|align="right"|+5.11
|-

|-
|}

References

External links
Information
 Elections Quebec

Election results
 Election results (National Assembly)
 Election results (QuébecPolitique)

Maps
 2011 map (PDF)
 2001 map (Flash)
2001–2011 changes (Flash)
1992–2001 changes (Flash)
 Electoral map of Lanaudière region
 Electoral map of Laurentides region
 Quebec electoral map, 2011 

Rousseau